Multicultural List (Norwegian: Flerkulturell liste, FKL) is a Norwegian immigrant political party/list.

History
The first and only time the party has completely independently run for election was in the 1995 municipal election in Oslo where it received 2.600 votes in the city. This accounted for about 10-12% of the immigrant votes. In the 1999 local elections the party cooperated with Red Electoral Alliance and got its leader and candidate Athar Ali elected as member of the Oslo city council.

Political profile
In February 1996 leader Athar Ali reacted strongly when a group of Muslim city councilmen in Oslo took indirect distance to the Fatwā against novelist Salman Rushdie. Shortly after the 1999 election, Athar Ali also said that arranged marriages should be accepted, stating that: "Arranged marriage is all in all a good arrangement where two families agree on a sort of contract. [...] For you [Norwegians] it seems completely absurd that a marriage should be controlled by something else than love between two persons." Otherwise they also want the state to acknowledge languages such as Urdu, Turkish, Arab and Vietnamese as official minority languages and get equal status with Sami. Other than cooperating with Red Electoral Alliance, the list have also expressed support for the Socialist Left Party.

References

1995 establishments in Norway
Political parties of minorities in Norway
Political parties in Norway
Political parties established in 1995